August Rätzer or Raetzer (1845–1907) was a Swiss entomologist who specialised in Lepidoptera. He was a Parson in Solothurn.
He wrote Rätzer, 1890 Lepidopterologische Nachlese Mitt. Schweiz. ent. Ges. 8 : 220–229 in which he first described Erebia christi.

References 
Groll, E. K. 2017: Biographies of the Entomologists of the World. – Online database, version 8, Senckenberg Deutsches Entomologisches Institut, Müncheberg – URL: sdei.senckenberg.de/biografies
Anon. 1911, Mitt, naturf, Ges. Solothurn 16: 144–148

Swiss lepidopterists
1907 deaths
1845 births